Etienne Kinsinger (born 8 September 1996) is a German Greco-Roman wrestler.

He competed at the World Wrestling Championships in 2017, 2018 and 2019. He also competed at the European Wrestling Championships in 2018 and 2019.

In March 2021, he qualified at the European Qualification Tournament to compete at the 2020 Summer Olympics in Tokyo, Japan. He competed in the men's 60 kg event where he was eliminated in his first match.

He lost his bronze medal match in the 63 kg event at the 2022 European Wrestling Championships in Budapest, Hungary.

References

External links 
 
 
 

1996 births
Living people
German male sport wrestlers
Wrestlers at the 2020 Summer Olympics
Olympic wrestlers of Germany
People from Püttlingen
Sportspeople from Saarland
21st-century German people